Naval Medical Research Unit Two (NAMRU-2) is a biomedical research laboratory of the US Navy established with the purpose to study infectious diseases of potential military significance in Asia. NAMRU-2 is officially registered as a subordinate command of Naval Medical Research Center located on Silver Spring, Maryland, U.S. and considered as the center network of laboratories around the world.

NAMRU-2 operates in several countries in Southeast Asia, including Vietnam, Laos, Singapore, Philippines, Thailand, and Indonesia. In Phnom Penh, Cambodia, NAMRU-2 opened, outfitted, and staffed a satellite laboratory to conduct regional infectious disease outbreak research, and diagnostic laboratory support within the Office of Defense Cooperation, U.S. Embassy Singapore.

Location

NAMRU-2 was founded as Naval Medical Research Unit 2, at Rockefeller University in New York City in 1944 with Captain Thomas Rivers as commanding officer. It moved to Guam in 1945 to study medical problems of the Navy and Marine Corps during World War II pacific operations. In 1955 Commander Robert Allan Phillips convinced US naval leadership that a research presence was needed in the pacific region. NAMRU-2 was reestablished in Taipei, Taiwan in 1955 with now Captain Phillips as its commanding officer. Phillips would remain as commander for the next 10 years.
In 1966, NAMRU-2 opened a detachment at the Naval Support Activity Hospital in Da Nang, South Vietnam. It was here that Lieutenant Myron Tong   performed some of his seminal research into pathogens infecting combat wounds resulting in the first descriptions of acinetobacter baumannii infection in combat casualties. The research detachment would remain until 1970 when it was disestablished.

In 1970, NAMRU-2 would establish a detachment in Jakarta, Indonesia upon the invitation of Indonesian Ministry of Health officials. In 1979, U.S. diplomatic recognition of the People's Republic of China resulted in the relocation of the NAMRU-2 Command from Taipei to Manila, Philippines and in 1990 due to political upheaval and possible threats to US personnel it was again relocated to Jakarta, Indonesia.  The facility in Jakarta is located in 62,000 square feet of laboratory, office and storage spaces in three buildings within the Indonesian Ministry of Health, National Institutes of Health (Badan LITBANGKES) compound. In the 1990s NAMRU-2 performed cutting edge research on the use of primaquine as primary prophylaxis for plasmodium falciparum malaria in Javanese men living in Irian Jaya.

In 1998, NAMRU-2 became part of the newly reorganized Naval Medical Research Center.

In 2002, Phnom Penh activities were established by NAMRU-2 to conduct regional infectious disease research and diagnostic laboratory support, operating out of a laboratory located at the National Institutes of Public Health, Phnom Penh, Cambodia. In 2007, to reflect Navy Medicine’s priorities in response to global emerging infectious disease threats, NAMRU-2 recognized the activities in Phnom Penh as a detachment, while at the same time opening a detachment within the Office of Defense Cooperation, U.S. Embassy Singapore.

Achievement

In 1946, NAMRU-2 was redesignated the U.S. Naval Institute of Tropical Medicine (NITM) reflecting its focus on tropical infections of interest to the military such as malaria and Dengue fever. In 1947 NAMRU-2 developed a therapeutic regimen for cholera utilizing whole blood and plasma-specific gravity as guides, this work was a breakthrough in determining life-saving extracellular fluid requirements. However NITM was disestablished shortly thereafter.

NAMRU-2 would respond to Cholera epidemics in Bangkok, Thailand in 1958, Sulawesi, Indonesia and the Philippines in 1961, where it became a world leader in cholera research and treatment. In 1961 it established a collaborative research site at San Lazaro Hospital in Manila to assist in the El tor cholera outbreak in the Philippines, here several key hypotheses of correct intravenous fluid rehydration for cholera treatment were proven.

In 1969 researchers at NAMRU-2 would be the first to demonstrate the role of attenuated Rubella vaccine in preventing naturally acquired disease in man.

Current Activities 
Surveillance of febrile illness
Surveillance of avian influenza
Investigation of Shigellosis morbidity
Investigation of drug resistant malaria
Medical entomology studies

Previous commanding officers
CAPT Robert Allan Phillips 1955-65
CAPT James R. Campbell 1999-2001
CAPT Harry J. Beecham
CAPT Mark T. Wooster
CAPT Trevor R. Jones 2008-2010
CAPT Gail L. Hathaway 2010–2012
CAPT George B. Schoeler 2012–2013
CAPT John Gilstad, Acting 2013
CAPT Carlos I. LeBron 2013–2014
CAPT Marshall R. Monteville, 2014–2017
CAPT Patrick Blair, 2017–present

References

Sources
 Navy Research timeline
 A Legacy in 20th-Century Medicine: Robert Allan Phillips and the Taming of Cholera
 Indonesia Turns Screw More: Booting Out US Naval Medical Laboratory?

External links 
 

Military medical research of the United States Navy